Sébastien "Sebbe" Godefroid (born 19 March 1971) is a Belgian sailor.

He won a silver medal in sailing at the 1996 Summer Olympics in Atlanta. He also competed at the 2000, 2004 and 2008 Olympics, but has not won another medal. He placed 7th in both the 2000 and 2004 Summer Olympics. At the 2008 Summer Olympics, he was the Belgian flag bearer during the opening ceremony. He ultimately placed 12th alongside his helmsman Carolijn Brouwer in the Tornado-class.

Results 
 1996: 3rd European Championship Finn
 1996: 2nd Olympic Games Atlanta Finn
 1998: 1st European Championship Finn
 2000: 2nd World Championship Finn
 2000: 7th Olympic Games Sidney Finn
 2001: 3rd European Championship Finn
 2001: 1st World Championship Finn
 2004: 7th Olympic Games Athens Finn
 2007: 2nd World Championship Tornado (with Carolijn Brouwer)
 2008: 12th Olympic Games Beijing Tornado (with Carolijn Brouwer)
 2016: 1st Belgian Championship Finn

References

External links
 
 

1971 births
Living people
Belgian male sailors (sport)
Olympic sailors of Belgium
Olympic silver medalists for Belgium
Olympic medalists in sailing
Sailors at the 1996 Summer Olympics – Finn
Sailors at the 2000 Summer Olympics – Finn
Sailors at the 2004 Summer Olympics – Finn
Sailors at the 2008 Summer Olympics – Tornado
Medalists at the 1996 Summer Olympics
Vrije Universiteit Brussel alumni
Finn class world champions
World champions in sailing for Belgium